Cephaloleia viltata is a species of rolled-leaf beetle in the family Chrysomelidae, first found in Costa Rica.

References

Endemic fauna of Costa Rica
Cassidinae